The 2021–22 Prairie View A&M Panthers basketball team represented Prairie View A&M University in the 2021–22 NCAA Division I men's basketball season. The Panthers, led by sixth-year head coach Byron Smith, played their home games at the William Nicks Building in Prairie View, Texas as members of the Southwestern Athletic Conference.

Previous season
In a season limited due to the ongoing COVID-19 pandemic, the Panthers finished the 2020–21 season 16–5, 13–0 in SWAC play to finish as the regular season co-champions, alongside Jackson State. In the SWAC tournament, they defeated Mississippi Valley State and Grambling State before being upset in the championship game by Texas Southern.

Roster

Schedule and results

|-
!colspan=12 style=| Non-conference regular season

|-
!colspan=12 style=| SWAC regular season

|-
!colspan=9 style=| SWAC tournament

Source

References

Prairie View A&M Panthers basketball seasons
Prairie View AandM Panthers
Prairie View AandM Panthers basketball
Prairie View AandM Panthers basketball